Bernard Behrens (September 28, 1926 – September 19, 2012) was a British-Canadian actor. He was most noted as a two-time Gemini Award winner, winning Best Actor in a Television Film or Miniseries at the 6th Gemini Awards in 1992 for his performance in the dramatic anthology series Saying Goodbye, and Best Supporting Actor in a Drama Program or Series at the 9th Gemini Awards in 1995 for the television film Coming of Age.

Born and raised in London, England, he moved to Canada at the start of World War II. Based in Winnipeg, Manitoba, he cofounded a theatre company there with Bill Walker, Helene Winston and Peggy Green in 1951. Although he often had supporting or guest roles in film and television, he was principally associated with stage roles, for theatre companies such as the Dominion Drama Festival, the Canadian Players and the Stratford Festival, as well as sometimes returning to the United Kingdom to perform at the Bristol Old Vic.

In addition to his two Gemini wins, he was also a nominee on two other occasions, being nominated for Best Supporting Actor in a Drama Program or Series at the 1st Gemini Awards in 1986 for the television film Turning to Stone, and Best Guest Actor in a Drama at the 20th Gemini Awards for an appearance on This Is Wonderland.

In 1981 he voiced the role of Obi-Wan Kenobi in a radio dramatization of Star Wars for National Public Radio.

He was married to Canadian actress Deborah Cass.

References

External links

1926 births
2012 deaths
20th-century British male actors
20th-century Canadian male actors
21st-century British male actors
21st-century Canadian male actors
British male film actors
British male radio actors
British male stage actors
British male television actors
British emigrants to Canada
Canadian male film actors
Canadian male radio actors
Canadian male Shakespearean actors
Canadian male stage actors
Canadian male television actors
Best Supporting Actor in a Drama Series Canadian Screen Award winners
Male actors from London